This is an alphabetical list of painters who are known for painting in the Nihonga style. It has to be noted that some artists also painted in the western Yōga style, and that the division between the two groups could be blurred at points.

Artists are listed by the native order of Japanese names, family name followed by given name, to ensure consistency even though some artists may be known outside Japan by their western-ordered name.

The list is broken down into the period during which the artist was first active: Meiji, Taishō, Shōwa and Heisei era.

Meiji era (1868-1912)
Hishida Shunsō 菱田春草 1874-1911
Kawai Gyokudō 川合玉堂 1873-1957
Maeda Seison 前田青邨 1885-1977
Hirata Shōdō 平田松堂 1882-1971
Otake Chikuha 尾竹 竹坡 1878-1936
Shimomura Kanzan 下村観山 1873-1930
Takeuchi Seihō 竹内栖鳳 1864-1942
Tomioka Tessai 富岡鉄斎 1837-1924
Uemura Shōen 上村松園 1875-1949
Yasuda Yukihiko 安田靫彦 1884-1978
Yokoyama Taikan 横山大観 1868-1958

Taishō era (1912-1926)
Hayami Gyoshū 速水御舟 1894-1935
Itō Shinsui 伊東深水 1898-1972
Kaburaki Kiyokata 鏑木清方 1878-1972
Kawabata Ryūshi 川端龍子 1885-1966
Murakami Kagaku 村上華岳 1888-1939
Takehisa Yumeji 竹久夢二 1884-1934
Tsuchida Bakusen 土田麦僊 1887-1936

Shōwa era (1926-1989)
Fuku Akino 秋野 不矩 1908-2001
Dōmoto Inshō 堂本印象 1891-1975
Higashiyama Kaii 東山魁夷 1908-1999
Hirayama Ikuo 平山郁夫 1930-2009
Fumiko Hori 堀文子 1918-2019
Kataoka Tamako 片岡球子 1905-2008
Katō Eizō 加藤栄三 1906-1972
Katō Tōichi 加藤東 1916-1996
Kitazawa Rakuten 北澤楽天 1876-1955
Koizumi Junsaku 小泉淳作 1924-2012
Kobayashi Kokei 小林古径 1883-1957
Katayama Bokuyō 片山牧羊, 1900-1937
Gakuryō Nakamura 中村 岳陵 1890-1969
Ogura Yuki 小倉遊亀 1895-2000
Okuda Gensō 奥田元宋 1912-2003
Okumura Togyū 奥村土牛 1889-1990
Sugiyama Yasushi 杉山寧 1909-1993
Tanaka Isson 田中一村 1908-1977
Uchida Aguri 内田あぐり 1949-
Yamaguchi Kayō 山口華楊 1899-1984
Tomohide Dote 土手朋英 1944-
Reiji Hiramatsu 平松 礼二 1941-

Heisei era (1989-2019)
Matsui Fuyuko 松井冬子 1974-
Nishida Shun'ei　西田俊英 1953-
Gotō Jin 後藤仁 1968-
Noguchi Tetsuya 野口哲哉 1980-

See also 
 List of Yōga painters
 List of Japanese painters

References

External links 

Nihonga painters
Japanese Nihonga painters